Leaving Normal may refer to:

 Leaving Normal (film), 1992 American film
 "Leaving Normal" (Roswell), episode of the TV series Roswell